The Glass Teat: Essays of Opinion on Television is a 1970 compilation of television reviews and essays written by Harlan Ellison as a regular weekly column for the Los Angeles Free Press from late 1968 to early 1970, discussing the effects of television upon society. 

The title implies that TV viewers are analogous with unweaned children. Discussion of television is frequently interspersed in the essays with lengthy asides about Ellison's personal life, experiences and opinions in general.

Modern critics have noted that his criticisms remain relevant.  The book's topics were dictated by the trends and fashions of the day. 

Ellison later collected a second volume of criticism entitled The Other Glass Teat, which was published in 1975.

References

External links
The Other Glass Teat

1970 non-fiction books
American essay collections
Books by Harlan Ellison
Books about television
Television criticism
Ace Books books
Essays about the media